The Train 20 (sleeper class Vande Bharath Express) is a proposed semi-high-speed, long-distance electric multiple unit (EMU) train which is supposed to be designed to replace the Rajdhani Express fleet of the Indian Railways. The rakes are expected to be similar to Train 18 (Vande Bharat), differing only in aluminium body and sleeping berths. This train was supposed to be used for long distances. Since it was planned to be operational by 2020, it was named as 'Train 20'.

Since this train will be of EMU type, a locomotive would not be necessary to haul the coaches, instead the carriages will be self propelled. The train is set to feature two distinctive classes, the air-conditioned chair car and sleeper cars. Under the sleeper coaches, AC 1st class, AC 2-tier and AC 3-tier would be the sub-classes available.

History
Most of the long distance train travel in India take more than twelve hours to complete the journey, making it hectic for the commuters. For example the Mumbai Rajdhani Express between Mumbai and New Delhi takes about 15 hours and 42 minutes. Introduction of a semi-high-speed rail with modern coaches would cut short the time significantly. Hence the Indian Railways started to upgrade the tracks as well as design new train rakes that could match the passenger rail standards operated across developed world.

During the designing phase of Vande Bharat Express, the Indian Railways had also planned to introduce a long-distance, sleeper version of the train. These trains were planned to replace the 50-year-old Rajdhani Express The EMU train with aluminium-body-coaches, a first of its kind in India, was estimated to cost ₹2,500 crores. It was expected to roll out by 2020, hence it was named as 'Train-2020' or 'Train 20' similar to its counterpart, Vande Bharat Express, which was initially called 'Train-18'.

As per the designers, the aluminium body would make it lighter, energy efficient and aesthetically 'better looking'. The companies from Japan, China and Europe were said to be in race to win the bid of design consultancy contract for Train 20. The tender as said by the officials, was supposed to be finalised by the mid February 2018. ICF planned to build two trains rakes by 2020 and thereafter add 24 more trains to the service in future. Although the pre-bid conference had attracted around seven global players, the Stadler-Medha consortium emerged as the sole bidder after final submission. Others lacked a pre-condition which says that the manufacturer should have an existing Make in India facility. The authorities began to examine the bid submitted by Swiss based consortium, Stadler.

In July 2018, the Nallasopara-Virar train shed which was built under 'Mumbai Rail Vikas Corporation', emerged as a shed which likely would maintain the Train 20 rakes. Western Railways were likely to operate the train which could potentially run from Mumbai to New Delhi.

The Indian Railways received a rap from the Department of Industrial Policy and Promotion (DIPP) which red-flagged the initial tender, where the Swiss based consortium emerged as sole bidder, stating that it was not in line with India's ambitious ‘Make in India’ project. Hence, a brand new tender was said to be floated with reworked conditions that would also take care of the interests of domestic manufacturers.

Government of India Floated Tenders to construct 200 new Sleeper class Vande Bharath Express.

Comparison to locomotive-hauled trains

See also

References

Proposed rail infrastructure in India
Higher-speed rail
Express trains in India